Shrishti Group of Schools is a group of 3 schools located in Vellore, Tamil Nadu, India.

Location
Shrishti is located in Brammapuram, a part of Katpadi in Vellore city in India's southern state, Tamil Nadu, between Chennai and Bangalore. It is 136 km west of Chennai and 220 km east of Bengaluru [Bangalore]. The nearest airport is Chennai, (a two and half hours drive). The Vellore- Katpadi junction railway station is 3.5 km from the school and accessible by train and road both from Chennai and Bengaluru. The school neighbors the VIT University.

About Shrishti 
Shrishti Vidyashram is a CBSE higher Secondary School in Vellore located on the sprawling Shrishti Campus, Vellore. Since its inception in June 2002 Shrishti CBSE has become one of the most preferred School for high quality education in Vellore District. The continuous academic and extra-curricular track records achieved by the students each year –stand testimony for the same. Backed by a committed management, dedicated teachers, a very active parents council, on-going developmental activities in terms of improvement of training methodologies for the students along with implementation of the latest technology and infrastructure.

Hostel
Shrishti started its Hostel in June 2010. It accommodates over 1100 students from ages 10 to 18.

References

 http://www.shrishti.org
 
 http://shrishtiorg.blogspot.com
 
 http://www.indiastudychannel.com/schools/57154-Shrishti-Matriculation-Higher-Secondary-School.aspx
 
 http://www.shrishti.org/cbse/hostel_fees.htm

External links 
 

High schools and secondary schools in Tamil Nadu
Schools in Vellore district
Education in Vellore
Educational institutions established in 1997
1997 establishments in Tamil Nadu